The Northumberland flag is the flag of the historic county of Northumberland and the banner of arms for Northumberland County Council.  The shield of arms is in turn based on the arms medieval heralds had attributed to the Kingdom of Bernicia (which the first County Council used until it received a regular grant of arms).  The Bernician arms were fictional but inspired by Bede's brief description of a flag used on the tomb of St Oswald in the 7th century.

The arms of the county council were granted in 1951, and the banner of those arms were registered by the Flag Institute as the flag of Northumberland in 1995. Despite a spokesman for the county council saying in 2000 that the "flag should only be rightfully flown within the present administrative County of Northumberland", the Flag Institute's registration description explicitly says that the flag is for the historic county of Northumberland, which contains the part of Tyne and Wear north of the Tyne, and so includes Newcastle upon Tyne, Tynemouth, Wallsend and Whitley Bay amongst other places.

The flag should be properly flown such that the upper hoist and lower fly are the corners that are golden, and the lower hoist and upper fly are the corners that are red. 



Flag design 

The Pantone colours for the flag are:
 Red 485
 Yellow 109

See also 
Northern Independence

References

External links 

 [ Flag Institute registration particulars]

Northumberland
Northumberland
Northumberland